Meredith Press was a publishing company based in New York, with a focus on science fiction and general literature. While Already in 1950 they had y published the Better Homes and Gardens Story Book, they were particularly active in the years 1967-1969.

Partial bibliography
The Utter Zoo, Edward Gorey (1967)
George Romney: Mormon in Politics, Clark R. Mollenhoff (1968)
Deathman, Do Not Follow Me, Jay Bennett (1968)
Starman's Quest, Robert Silverberg (1969)
The Devil's Daughter, Eleazar Lipsky (1969)
Love My Children: an Autobiography, Rose Browne Butler (1969)

External links
Meredith Press at the Internet Speculative Fiction Database

American speculative fiction publishers
Publishing companies of the United States
Companies based in New York (state)
Science fiction publishers

Publishing companies established in the 20th century